William Banks Bader (September 8, 1931 – March 16, 2016) was an American diplomat who served as the assistant secretary of state for educational and cultural affairs from 1999 to 2001.

Early life and education
Bader's paternal grandfather was Edward L. Bader, who was mayor of Atlantic City, New Jersey and is of German and Scottish heritage. He was educated at Pomona College, receiving a Bachelor of Arts in 1953. He then studied as a Fulbright scholar at Ludwig Maximilian University of Munich and the University of Vienna. During his time in Munich, Bader married his Pomona college classmate, sculptor Gretta Lange; they had four children, one of whom is actor Diedrich Bader. He served in the United States Navy from 1955 to 1958 on active duty and later transferred to the Reserves before retiring with the rank of captain. He then studied German history at Princeton University under Gordon A. Craig, earning a Master of Arts in 1960 and a PhD in 1964.

Career 
Bader joined the United States Foreign Service in 1965, and was posted to the Bureau of Political-Military Affairs in Washington, D.C. In 1966, Sen. J. William Fulbright (D-AR) invited Bader to join the staff of the United States Senate Committee on Foreign Relations where he was a senior staff member overseeing international security and arms control from 1966 to 1969. During this time, he also worked for the United States Senate Foreign Relations Subcommittee on Near Eastern and South and Central Asian Affairs, chaired by Sen. Stuart Symington (D-MO).

In the early 1970s, Bader worked for the Ford Foundation in Paris. He became a fellow of the Woodrow Wilson International Center for Scholars in 1974.

Bader returned to government in 1976 when he was appointed deputy under secretary of defense for policy. He returned to the staff of the United States Senate Committee on Foreign Relations in 1978 as Staff Director at a time when the committee was considering the Camp David Accords, the Taiwan Relations Act, and SALT II.

In 1981, Bader became Vice President and Senior Officer of the Washington, D.C. office of SRI International. He moved to California in 1988 to become Vice President of SRI International's policy division. He became president of the Eurasia Foundation in 1992. He spent 1996–97 as a visiting fellow at the World Bank Group.

In 1999, President of the United States Bill Clinton nominated Bader to be assistant secretary of state for educational and cultural affairs and, after Senate confirmation, Bader held the office from November 18, 1999 until January 20, 2001.

Bader and his wife had four children, including actor Diedrich Bader.

Selected publications 
 "Oesterreich in Potsdam" in Oesterreichische Zeitschrift für Aussenpolitik, Vol. II, No. 4, June 1962
 "The United States and the 'German Problem'" in Foreign Affairs, 1965
 Austria Between East and West: 1945–1955, Stanford University Press, 1966
 The United States and the Spread of Nuclear Weapons, Pegasus, 1968
 "The Congress and National Security" in Naval War College Review, 1970
 "The Proliferation of Conventional Weapons" in The Future of the International Legal Order, Vol. III, ed. C.E. Black and Richard Falk, 1971
 "Congress and the Making of the U.S. Security Policies," Adelphi Paper No. 173, IISS, London, England, 1982
 "Austria, The United States, and the Path to Neutrality" in The Austrian Solution, ed. Robert A. Bauer, 1982
 "Western Europe" in TRANSACTION/SOCIETY, Vol. 22, No. 4, May/June 1985
 "Western Europe: From Roosevelt to Reagan" in The President, the Congress and Foreign Policy: A Joint Policy Project of the Association of Former Members of Congress and the Atlantic Council of the United States, Lanham, New York; London, England; University Press of New York, 1986
 The Taiwan Relations Act: A Decade of Implementation, Hudson Institute, Indianapolis, Indiana, ed. William Bader and Jeffrey Bergner, 1989

See also
 Diedrich Bader
 Edward L. Bader

References

Department of State – Biography: William B. Bader

Further reading
 "The 60th Anniversary of the Fulbright Program in Austria: 1950 – 2010: Seeing the World as Others See It", Bridges: The OST's Publication on S&T Policy, vol. 26, July 2010.

1931 births
2016 deaths
United States Assistant Secretaries of State
United States Department of Defense officials
United States Navy officers
SRI International people
World Bank people
Pomona College alumni
University of Vienna alumni
Princeton University alumni
Clinton administration personnel
American expatriates in Germany
American officials of the United Nations
American people of German descent
American people of Scottish descent
Burials at Arlington National Cemetery